Kut Khaopun is a district (amphoe) in the northern part of Ubon Ratchathani province, northeastern Thailand.

History
The minor district (king amphoe) Kut Khaopun was created on 12 July 1971, when the four tambons Khaopun, Ka Bin, Kaeng Kheng, and Non Sawang were split off from Trakan Phuet Phon district. It was upgraded to a full district on 25 March 1979.

Geography
Neighboring districts are (from the northeast clockwise) Khemarat, Pho Sai, Trakan Phuet Phon of Ubon Ratchathani Province and Pathum Ratchawongsa of Amnat Charoen province.

Administration
The district is divided into five sub-districts (tambons), which are further subdivided into 73 villages (mubans). Kut Khaopun is a township (thesaban tambon) which covers parts of tambon Khaopun. There are a further five tambon administrative organizations (TAO).

References

External links
amphoe.com

Kut Khaopun